Røa Gjerdefabrikk is a manufacturing company based in Vestre Aker, Oslo, Norway.

It was founded in 1954 by Bjørn Berg Larsen, and bought by Arne Austad in 1985. The manufacturing facilities have always been located at Woxen farm near Bogstad, and the company also runs a shop there. Its products are fences, gates, alarm and surveillance equipment.

References

External links

Manufacturing companies of Norway
Companies based in Oslo
Manufacturing companies established in 1954
1954 establishments in Norway